The Isle of Demons is a phantom island once associated with Quirpon Island, Newfoundland, in Canada. It was generally shown as two islands. It began appearing on maps in the beginning of the 16th century and disappeared in the mid-17th century. It could also simply be a translation from First Nations people who often avoided areas where a person had died, believing it was haunted by spirits. This results in many islands with the same reference.

It was believed that the island was populated by demons and wild beasts which would torment and attack any ships that passed or anyone that was foolish enough to wander onto the island. A French noblewoman, Marguerite de La Rocque, was marooned on an island in the mid-16th century, allegedly because of an affair with a young man on her ship. This island is a possible site of their abandonment, and residents and visitors have claimed to see the couple. Across the centuries, many historians, novelists, poets and singers have retold the story of Marguerite abandoned on the island. It is believed now that the island of the marooning is most likely Harrington Harbour, Quebec.

The Isle of Demons first appears in the 1508 map of Johannes Ruysch. It may simply be a relocated version of the older legendary island of Satanazes ("Devils" in Portuguese) that was normally depicted in 15th century maps in the middle of the Atlantic Ocean just north of Antillia. With the Atlantic better mapped with the trans-oceanic voyages of the 1490s, Ruysch may simply have transplanted old Satanazes to a more suitable location.

 
The Isle of Demons continues to appear as late as the 1556 map of "La Nueva Francia" by Giacomo Gastaldi – that is, after Jacques Cartier's expeditions (1534, 1535, 1541) had explored much of Newfoundland and the Gulf of St. Lawrence. The "Isola de Demoni" is depicted by Gastaldi as a substantially large island roughly encompassing northern Newfoundland, with figurative depictions of flying demons.

References

Phantom Arctic islands
Islands of Newfoundland and Labrador